Gzhel is the name of several rural localities in Russia:
Gzhel (selo), Moscow Oblast, a selo in Gzhelskoye Rural Settlement of Ramensky District in Moscow Oblast; 
Gzhel (settlement), Moscow Oblast, a settlement in Gzhelskoye Rural Settlement of Ramensky District in Moscow Oblast; 
Gzhel, Smolensk Oblast, a village in Bogdanovshchinskoye Rural Settlement of Safonovsky District in Smolensk Oblast